Operation Desert Spring was part of an ongoing operation in Kuwait by the United States that was established on December 31, 1998, following Operation Desert Storm and Operation Desert Shield. The mission objective is to maintain a forward presence and provide control and force protection over the military of Kuwait.

Operation Desert Spring ended with the beginning of Operation Iraqi Freedom on 18 March 2003.

Participants in Operation Desert Spring are entitled to receive the Armed Forces Expeditionary Medal.

Kuwait–United States relations
Desert Spring
20th-century military history of the United States
1998 in international relations